Dassu (Balti/), also spelt Dasu or Dusso, is a town in Shigar, Baltistan, Pakistan. It is located at 35°43'0N 75°31'0E' and has an altitude of 2440 metres (8008 feet).

References

Populated places in Shigar District